Elverta Joint Elementary School District  is a public school district based in Sacramento County, California, United States. It has three schools: Alpha Middle School, Elverta Elementary School, and Alpha Charter School.

References

External links
 

School districts in Sacramento County, California